The House at 491 Prospect Street in Methuen, Massachusetts is locally significant as an excellent example of a Shingle Style house of the type built for well-to-do businessmen in Methuen and Lawrence around the turn of the 20th century.  The three story wood-frame building was built c. 1900.  One of its principal decorative features at the time of its listing on the National Register of Historic Places in 1984 was a Palladian window in the gable, around which square-cut shingles had been arranged in a keystone motif.  This detail has since been lost due to the application of new siding.

Other details of note include curved exterior corners, a window recessed in a bay with curved walls, and small decorative rectangular and oval windows.  The property also includes a period carriage house.

See also
 National Register of Historic Places listings in Methuen, Massachusetts
 National Register of Historic Places listings in Essex County, Massachusetts

References

Houses in Methuen, Massachusetts
Shingle Style houses
National Register of Historic Places in Methuen, Massachusetts
Houses on the National Register of Historic Places in Essex County, Massachusetts
Shingle Style architecture in Massachusetts